The Journal of Atmospheric and Oceanic Technology is a scientific publication by the American Meteorological Society.
The journal includes papers describing the instrumentation and methodology used in atmospheric and oceanic research including computational techniques, methods for data acquisition, processing, and interpretation, and information systems and algorithms.

See also 
 List of scientific journals
 List of scientific journals in earth and atmospheric sciences

External links 
 AMS publication site

Oceanography journals
English-language journals
Publications established in 1984
Monthly journals
American Meteorological Society academic journals
Meteorology journals